CTRLZAK is a hybrid studio bordering between art, design and architecture integrating diverse disciplines and cultures. The name [kənˈtrəul/zæk] derives from the initials of its founders and the computer key combination CTRL+Z, used in standard alphanumeric keyboards to take you a step back.

History 
Founded in the beginning of 2009 in Milan, Italy, by Artists and Designers Katia Meneghini and Thanos Zakopoulos, CTRLZAK was first introduced to the wider public through the project Remeditate; a series of items inspired by the medical world, reflecting upon the symbolic and functional issues of objects, presented during SaloneSatellite 2009, in the context of the Milan Furniture Fair.

Philosophy 
Through their projects and extensive research into tradition and cultural context CTRLZAK proposes a new hybrid future through the teachings of the past. The studio creates artworks, objects and spaces where irony and symbolism go beyond aesthetics and functionality, in order to activate mechanisms of reflection. A characteristic example of the studio's approach is Transubstantia Paganus, a symbolic project that operates as a comment on mass consumerism and the lack of real values in contemporary society.

Selected projects 
Following on their historical research, CTRLZAK created the CeramiX Art Collection in 2010, consisting of 24 unique pieces derived from classic Chinese and European plates, bowls, vases and cups. The resulting artworks reflect on the historical production of Chinese and European porcelain and centuries of cross-fertilization between Western and Eastern aesthetics. The project was later on translated for a broader audience, bringing art into everyday life, with the Hybrid project (2011– 2015) produced by Italian brand Seletti. The objects are graphically divided between east and west, with a colored line marking the boundary between the two styles. The collection looks at the present while reflecting on the irony of history proposing consequently an evocative contemporary interpretation. In December 2014, in the exhibition Paradigms of a Hybrid World at Spaziootto in Milan, the studio presented an overview of its research on historical hybridization between east and west including the aforementioned projects together with pieces from their Flagmented project and  collection designed for rug producer cc-tapis. Since 2015, they are responsible for the art direction of JCP Universe; an unconventional company between art and design that operates in the sphere of contemporary living. Under the studio's direction the project brought together a number of notable product designers collaborating alongside video makers, theatre professionals, visual artists, writers and other creatives. CTRLZAK has also dedicated many years (2012–2017) in the research of a project named Extincto, concerning human awareness related to issues of species extinction and the loss of biodiversity caused by mankind, mainly in the last 500 years. Following a meticulous research, they analyzed a number of emblematic cases of extinct species and presented them in the forms of artworks and objects showing how species have in many cases vanished as a result of human intervention and ignorance.

Current projects in progress include the design direction of hotel resorts, among them the awarded  all senses resort in Chalkidiki, Greece, creative direction for design related brands, art exhibitions and the design of objects connected to the sphere of living for various Italian brands.

Recognition 
CTRLZAK's creations have been extensively exhibited in art galleries and design fairs around the world and their work has been selected by museums and institutions like MOMA, the Louvre Museum and the Venice Art Biennale, among others.

Selected bibliography 
 The Design-City: Milan: Extraordinary Lab. Forma Edizioni, 2018, pp. 396–399. 
 Ceci n’est pas une copie. Lannοο Publishers, 2016, pp. 205–207. 
 La casa morbida. Corraini Edizioni, 2014, pp. 69. 
 The New Italian Design, Triennale Design Museum, 2013, pp. 45. 
 Modern Living Accessories 100 Years of Design. H.F.Ullmann Publishing, 2011, pp. 12–13. 
 Leuchten/ Lighting. Edel Germany, 2009, pp. 38. 
 Möbel/ Furniture. Edel Germany, 2009, pp. 207–208.

References

External links 
Official website
thanoszakopoulos.com
katiameneghini.com
Yatzer CTRLZAK
Designboom CTRLZAK

Design companies of Italy
Italian designers
Italian furniture designers
Italian interior designers
20th-century Italian artists